Americans for Peace Now (APN) is a nonprofit organization based in the United States whose stated aim is to help achieve a comprehensive political resolution of the Israeli–Palestinian conflict. Founded in 1981 as the sister organization to Israel's Shalom Achshav (Peace Now), APN describes itself as a nonpartisan, nonprofit, pro-Israel, pro-peace, American Jewish organization. The president and CEO of APN is Hadar Susskind. APN defines itself as "the leading voice of American Jews who support Israel and know that only peace will ensure Israel's security, prosperity and continued viability as a Jewish, democratic state." APN asserts that the "positions advocated for more than two decades by APN and Shalom Achshav – like calling for the evacuation of settlements and the creation of a viable Palestinian state – are now recognized by most American Jews and Israelis as basic requirements both for peace and for a secure future for Israel."

APN's website describes the organization as "a non-partisan organization with a non-partisan mission." According to APN, it supplies "timely information and education, providing a pro-Israel, pro-peace, American Jewish perspective on issues and legislation. APN also engages in grassroots political activism and outreach to the American Jewish and Arab American communities, opinion leaders, university students and the public. We further promote our agenda through press releases, editorials and personal contacts with journalists, serving as a respected source of balanced information, analysis, and commentary."

History 
In 1978, 348 senior Israeli army officers wrote a letter to Prime Minister Menachem Begin calling for peace between Israel and Egypt. The letter stated, "the government policy, perpetuating its rule over a million Arabs, could harm the Jewish-democratic character of the state, and makes it difficult for us to identify with the task. Mindful of Israel's security needs and the difficulties on the path to peace, we nevertheless consider that real security can be achieved only when we achieve peace." This petition led to the creation of Shalom Achshav (Peace Now in Hebrew), a grassroots movement dedicated to raising public support for the peace process.

APN was founded in 1981 to support the activities of Shalom Achshav; originally known as American Friends of Peace Now, it changed its name to its present form in 1989. The organization played only a marginal role in American Jewish life in the 1980s, but grew in significance in the 1990s; around 1992 it reported a membership of 10,000 members, in 21 chapters throughout the United States, and was accepted for membership in the Conference of Presidents of Major American Jewish Organizations.

APN's activities have grown to include: media outreach and monitoring, government relations, and public outreach.

Activities and stated goals 
According to Americans for Peace Now, it is "the leading voice of American Jews who support Israel and know that only peace will ensure Israel's security, prosperity and continued viability as a Jewish, democratic state." APN asserts that the "positions advocated for more than two decades by APN and Shalom Achshav – like calling for the evacuation of settlements and the creation of a viable Palestinian state – are now recognized by most American Jews and Israelis as basic requirements both for peace and for a secure future for Israel."

APN is a member of the Conference of Presidents of Major American Jewish Organizations.

Public outreach 
The organization maintains an active website with information, commentary, and advocacy about current events relating to the Israeli-Palestinian conflict. It sponsors and participates in public events, and sends speakers to communities around the country to promote the cause of peace. APN publishes the APN Weekly Update, a weekly email newsletter on events in Israel and the Middle East that includes its "Hard Questions, Tough Answers" and "Legislative Round-Up" segments. APN also publishes News Nosh, a daily news roundup. In 2011, APN released Indefensible: Misrepresenting the Borders Issue to Undermine Israeli-Palestinian Peace. In 2012, it released, in print and online, the pamphlet They Say, We Say, in which it aimed to address common arguments concerning Israel and the Israeli-Palestinian conflict; a second edition was published in September 2014.

Goals 

 An American Jewish community and general American public educated about the strategic and economic benefits of security through peace in the Middle East.
 Active White House and State Department engagement in the peace process, especially administration efforts to broker a new interim understanding between Israelis and Palestinians, facilitate final status arrangements that reconcile Israeli security with Palestinian statehood, and encourage negotiations between Israel and its neighbors.
 Congressional support for the peace process through continued aid to Israel, Egypt, Jordan, and the Palestinians.
 Broad awareness in the United States of the benefits of Shalom Achshav programs in Israel.
 A firm financial base for Shalom Achshav and APN activities.

See also 
 Projects working for peace among Israelis and Arabs
 Israeli–Palestinian peace process
 Partners for Progressive Israel
 J Street

References

External links 
 Peace Now 
 Americans for Peace Now

Non-governmental organizations involved in the Israeli–Palestinian peace process
Jewish anti-occupation groups
Jewish-American political organizations
Jewish charities based in the United States
Charities based in Washington, D.C.
Peace Now

de:Peace Now
fr:La paix maintenant
he:שלום עכשיו
pl:Pokój Teraz
pt:Peace Now